Silvia Hagen is an author who has published for O'Reilly Media on such topics as Internet Protocol version 6 in a book titled "IPv6 Essentials". She lives in Switzerland. In 2010, Silvia joined the  BlueCat Networks Technical Advisory Board. She has many years of experience in consulting enterprises in Europe and the US for the introduction of IPv6. Since 2014 she engages in the agile community, co-founded the network flowdays and brings more and more agile elements in the complex task of IPv6 planning and deployment.

Bibliography

References

Living people
Swiss non-fiction writers
Year of birth missing (living people)